Luis Vizcaíno Árias (born August 6, 1974) is a Dominican Republic former professional baseball pitcher. He played for the Oakland Athletics, Milwaukee Brewers, Chicago White Sox, Arizona Diamondbacks, New York Yankees, Colorado Rockies, Chicago Cubs, and Cleveland Indians in his career.

Career

In his three years with the Brewers, Vizcaíno was a workhorse. Milwaukee then sent him to the Chicago White Sox along with Scott Podsednik and Travis Hinton for Carlos Lee.

With the White Sox, Vizcaíno had another solid year, going 6-5 with a 3.73 ERA in 65 appearances for the  World Champions (he pitched one scoreless inning during the World Series in his only playoff appearance). After the season, Chicago traded him to the Arizona Diamondbacks. In , Vizcaíno went 4-6 and posted a 3.75 ERA in 70 games for the Diamondbacks.

On January 9, Vizcaíno was traded to the New York Yankees with three prospects for Randy Johnson. He achieved a rare feat on July 21, 2007, when he was credited with both wins in relief in a day-night doubleheader for the Yankees, joining about 30 other pitchers.

In 2007, he pitched in 77 games, which was 4th-most in the AL. On December 21, 2007, he signed with the Colorado Rockies. On January 6, 2009, Vizcaíno was traded to the Chicago Cubs for Jason Marquis. Vizcaíno was designated for assignment and released by the Cubs on April 23, 2009.

On May 8, 2009, Vizcaíno signed a minor league deal with the Cleveland Indians. He then was signed to a major league deal on May 14. He was designated for assignment on June 23, and released on June 30 after clearing waivers.

Vizcaíno performed well in the Dominican Winter League following the 2010 season. On December 19, 2010, Vizcaíno signed a minor league contract to return with New York Yankees with an invitation to spring training. His contract was voided on February 9, 2011 because of a tear to his achilles tendon.

On June 29, 2011, he was suspended for 50 games by Major League Baseball for testing positive for the banned performance-enhancing drug stanozolol.

Despite pitching 546.2 career innings in the major leagues, Vizcaino handled 83 total chances (30 putouts, 53 assists) without an error.

Vizcaino signed a minor league deal with the Baltimore Orioles in January 2014. He was released in March, and ended his career with the Mexican League in 2015.

Personal life
Vizcaino was born in Baní, Dominican Republic.

Vizcaino's second cousin, José Vizcaíno, was a long-time MLB infielder.

On October 27, 2008, Vizcaíno was arrested for DUI after being pulled over for driving 71 MPH in a 45 MPH zone.

References

External links

1974 births
Águilas Cibaeñas players
Arizona Diamondbacks players
Arizona League Athletics players
Chicago Cubs players
Chicago White Sox players
Cleveland Indians players
Colorado Rockies players
Colorado Springs Sky Sox players
Dominican Republic expatriate baseball players in Canada
Dominican Republic expatriate baseball players in Mexico
Dominican Republic expatriate baseball players in Taiwan
Dominican Republic expatriate baseball players in the United States
EDA Rhinos players
Huntsville Stars players

Living people
Leones de Yucatán players
New York Yankees players
Major League Baseball pitchers
Major League Baseball players from the Dominican Republic
Mexican League baseball pitchers
Milwaukee Brewers players
Modesto A's players
Oakland Athletics players
People from Baní
Sacramento River Cats players
Southern Oregon Timberjacks players
Sultanes de Monterrey players
Uni-President 7-Eleven Lions players
Vancouver Canadians players